G. M. Paterson was a British barrister and politician. He was the Attorney General of Ghana after Ghana attained independence from the United Kingdom in 1957. He was the Attorney General in Kwame Nkrumah's Convention People's Party (CPP) government which was ruling the Gold Coast under British rule prior to 1957. He continued in the Nkrumah government until August 1957 when he was replaced by Geoffrey Bing, another British barrister.

Paterson studied at St John's College, Cambridge between 1924 and 1929. He and other colleagues from the College ended up in the colonial administration of the Gold Coast.

References

Year of birth missing
Justice ministers of Ghana
Alumni of St John's College, Cambridge
20th-century British lawyers
British expatriates in Ghana
Attorneys General of Ghana
Year of death missing